The Menard–Hodges site (3AR4) (also known as Menard-Hodges Mounds  and Osotouy), is an archaeological site in Arkansas County, Arkansas. It includes two large platform mounds as well as several house mounds. It is the type site for the Menard phase, a protohistoric Mississippian culture group.

The Menard Mound was named for Frank Menard, on whose farm the mound was discovered.

Description

The site is considered as a possible candidate for the Province of Anilco encountered by the Hernando de Soto Entrada in 1540. It was contemporaneous with the Parkin site, believed by many archaeologists to be the location of the province of Casqui, and the Nodena site, believed by many archaeologists to be the location of the province of Pacaha.

The site is also considered to be the location of the protohistoric Quapaw village of Osotouy (or Ossoteoue) first encountered by French explorers in the late 17th century. The Quapaw at the time had four villages, Kappa, Ossoteoue, Touriman, and Tonginga. Kappa was reported to have been on the eastern bank of the Mississippi River and the other three located on the western bank in or near present-day Desha County, Arkansas. The location was excavated by James A. Ford in 1958. The excavations included burials, with graves in extended, flexed, and secondary interments scattered throughout the site and oriented in many different directions. The site has yielded evidence of occupation as early as the Baytown Period (300-700 CE), all the way to the European contact period in the 16th century. The most unusual formation at the site is Mound A, which is conical in shape, and was built in two stages. Ceramics found at the site are consistent with native occupation at the time Henri de Tonti established the first French outpost west of the Mississippi at the Arkansas Post in 1686.

The site was listed on the National Register of Historic Places in 1985, and declared a National Historic Landmark in 1989.

See also
 Hodges House (Bismarck, Arkansas)
 List of sites and peoples visited by the Hernando de Soto Expedition
 History of the Tunica people
 List of National Historic Landmarks in Arkansas
 National Register of Historic Places listings in Arkansas County, Arkansas

References

�

Archaeological type sites
Middle Mississippian culture
National Historic Landmarks in Arkansas
Geography of Arkansas County, Arkansas
Former populated places in Arkansas
Archaeological sites on the National Register of Historic Places in Arkansas
National Park Service areas in Arkansas
Protected areas of Arkansas County, Arkansas
National Register of Historic Places in Arkansas County, Arkansas
Mounds in Arkansas
Arkansas Post